Traill may refer to:

 Traill (surname), including a list of people with the name
 Traill County, North Dakota, a county in the U.S.
 Traill International School, in Bangkok, Thailand 
 Traill Island, in eastern Greenland 
 'Traill', a cultivar of barley 
 Kapp Traill, headland at the southern part of Jan Mayen in Norway named after Thomas Stewart Traill

See also 
 
 Trail (disambiguation)
 Miss Traill's House, historic property in Bathurst, Australia 
 Mr. Perrin and Mr. Traill, a 1911 novel and 1948 film
 Traill's flycatcher, supposed bird species